Every Monday Morning is the debut studio album by American country music artist Sarah Darling. It was first released digitally on June 18, 2009 by Black River Entertainment, with a physical CD release following on July 28, 2009.

The album includes the singles "Jack of Hearts" and "Whenever It Rains" as well as the song that initially brought her to the attention of the record's producer Jimmy Nichols, "Stop the Bleeding". Five music videos were also made to promote the release. A deluxe edition of the album was later digitally released on the iTunes Store and included two of these videos in addition to the radio version of "Whenever It Rains" and a previously unreleased song entitled "Everything Girl".

Track listing

Personnel
Shaunna Bolton – background vocals
Spady Brannan – bass guitar
Pat Buchanan – electric guitar
Tom Bukovac – electric guitar
Eric Darken – percussion
Sarah Darling – lead vocals
Jeff Dayton – acoustic guitar, electric guitar
Rick Ferrell – background vocals
Shawn Fichter – drums
Larry Franklin – fiddle
Paul Franklin – steel guitar
Tommy Harden – drums 
David Hungate – bass guitar
Tammy Rogers King – fiddle 
B. James Lowry – acoustic guitar
Jerry McPherson – electric guitar
Jimmy Nichols – Hammer dulcimer, Fender Rhodes, Hammond B-3 organ, keyboards, piano, synthesizer, Wurlitzer, background vocals
Billy Panda – acoustic guitar
Michael Spriggs – acoustic guitar
Biff Watson – acoustic guitar

References

2009 debut albums
Sarah Darling albums
Black River Entertainment albums